"Sure Thing" is a song written and recorded by American country music duo Foster & Lloyd.  It was released in September 1987 as the second single from their self-titled debut album.  It reached number 8 on both the Billboard Hot Country Songs chart and the Canadian RPM country Tracks chart in 1987.

Chart performance

References

1987 singles
1987 songs
Foster & Lloyd songs
Songs written by Radney Foster
RCA Records singles
Songs written by Bill Lloyd (country musician)